One Night Stand is a 2011 opera by Finnish composer Olli Kortekangas and librettist Michael Baran. It was commissioned by the Sibelius Academy and premiered in the Helsinki Music Center in October 2011.

References 

Program notes/World premiere, Sibelius Academy Opera, Helsinki, October 2011

Operas
Finnish-language operas
2011 operas
Operas by Olli Kortekangas